Cadulus is a large genus of small tusk shells in the family Gadilidae. It contains over fifty-one described species.

Species 

 Cadulus acus Dall, 1889 
 Cadulus aequalis Dall, 1881
 Cadulus agassizii Dall, 1881
 Cadulus albicomatus Dall, 1890
 Cadulus amiantus Dall, 1889
 Cadulus amphora Jeffreys, 1883
 Cadulus ampullaceus Watson, 1879
 Cadulus aratus Hedley, 1899
 Cadulus arctus Henderson, 1920 
 Cadulus artatus Locard, 1897
 Cadulus atlanticus Henderson, 1920
 Cadulus attenuatus Monterosato, 1875
 Cadulus austinclarki Emerson, 1951 
 Cadulus californicus (Pilsbry and Sharp, 1898)
 Cadulus campylus Melvill, 1906
 Cadulus catharus Henderson, 1920
 Cadulus chuni Jaeckel, 1932
 Cadulus colliverae Lamprell & Healy, 1998
 Cadulus congruens Watson, 1879
 Cadulus cucurbitus Dall, 1881
 Cadulus curtus Watson, 1879
 Cadulus cyathoides Jaeckel, 1932
 Cadulus cylindratus Jeffereys, 1877
 Cadulus delicatulus Suter, 1913
 Cadulus deschampsi Scarabino, 2008
 Cadulus deverdensis Scarabino, 2008
 Cadulus eliezeri Caetano, Scarabino & Absalão, 2006
 Cadulus euloides Melvill & Standen, 1901
 Cadulus exiguus Watson, 1879
 Cadulus florenciae Scarabino, 1995
 Cadulus foweyensis Henderson, 1920
 Cadulus gibbus Jeffreys, 1883
 Cadulus glans Scarabino, 1995
 Cadulus gracilis Jeffreys, 1877
 Cadulus greenlawi Dall, 1889 
 Cadulus iota Henderson, 1920 
 Cadulus jeffreysi (Monterosato, 1875)
 Cadulus labeyriei Scarabino, 1995
 Cadulus lemniscoides Scarabino, 2008
 Cadulus loyaltyensis Scarabino, 2008
 Cadulus lunulus Dall, 1881
 Cadulus macleani Emerson, 1978
 Cadulus mayori (J. B. Henderson, 1920) 
 Cadulus miamiensis J. B. Henderson, 1920  
 Cadulus minusculus Dall, 1889
 Cadulus monterosatoi Locard, 1897
 Cadulus nerta Caetano, Scarabino & Absalão, 2006
 Cadulus obesus Watson, 1879
 Cadulus occiduus Verco, 1911
 Cadulus ovulum (Philippi, 1844)
 Cadulus parvus J. B. Henderson, 1920
 Cadulus platei Jaeckel, 1932
 Cadulus platensis Henderson, 1920
 Cadulus podagrinus Henderson, 1920
 Cadulus propinquus Sars G.O., 1878
 Cadulus providensis Henderson, 1920 
 Cadulus quadridentatus Dall, 1881 
 Cadulus quadrifissatus (Pilsbry and Sharp, 1898) 
 Cadulus rastridens Watson, 1879 
 Cadulus regularis Henderson, 1920 
 Cadulus rocroii Scarabino, 2008
 Cadulus rossoi Nicklès, 1979
 Cadulus rudmani Lamprell & Healy, 1998
 Cadulus scarabinoi Steiner & Kabat, 2004
 Cadulus siberutensis Jaeckel, 1932
 Cadulus simillimus Watson, 1879
 Cadulus sofiae Scarabino, 1995
 Cadulus stearnsii (Pilsbry and Sharp, 1898) 
 Cadulus subfusiformis (M. Sars, 1865)
 Cadulus teliger Finlay, 1927
 Cadulus tersus Henderson, 1920
 Cadulus tetraschistus (Watson, 1879) 
 Cadulus tetrodon Pilsbry and Sharp, 1898 
 Cadulus thielei Plate, 1908
 Cadulus tolmiei (Dall, 1897) 
 Cadulus transitorius (J. B. Henderson, 1920) - inflated toothshell
 Cadulus tumidosus Jeffreys, 1877
 Cadulus unilobatus V. Scarabino & F. Scarabino, 2011
 Cadulus valdiviae Jaeckel, 1932
 Cadulus vincentianus Cotton & Godfrey, 1940
 Cadulus watsoni Dall, 1881
 Cadulus woodhousae Lamprell & Healy, 1998

Species brought into synonymy
 Cadulus aberrans Whiteaves, 1887 - aberrant toothshell: synonym of Gadila aberrans (Whiteaves, 1887)
 Cadulus booceras Tomlin, 1926: synonym of Siphonodentalium booceras (Tomlin, 1926)
 Cadulus carolinensis Bush, 1885: synonym of Polyschides carolinensis (Bush, 1885)
 Cadulus domingensis (d'Orbigny in Mörch, 1863): synonym of Gadila dominguensis (d’Orbigny, 1853)
 Cadulus carolinensis Bush, 1885: synonym of Polyschides carolinensis (Bush, 1885)
 Cadulus colubridens Watson, 1879: synonym of Siphonodentalium colubridens (R. B. Watson, 1879)
 Cadulus elongatus J. B. Henderson, 1920: synonym of Gadila elongata (Henderson, 1920)
 Cadulus fusiformis Pilsbry and Sharp, 1898: synonym of Gadila aberrans (Whiteaves, 1887)
 Cadulus grandis A. E. Verrill, 1884: synonym of Polyschides grandis (Verrill, 1884)
 Cadulus halius Henderson, 1920: synonym of Cadulus podagrinus Henderson, 1920
 Cadulus hepburni (Dall, 1897): synonym of Gadila aberrans (Whiteaves, 1887)
 Cadulus laevis (Brazier, 1877): synonym of Ditrupa gracillima Grube, 1878
 Cadulus martini Scarabino, 1995: synonym of Cadulus scarabinoi Steiner & Kabat, 2004
 Cadulus nitentior Arnold, 1903 †: synonym of Gadila aberrans (Whiteaves, 1887)
 Cadulus nitidus: synonym of Polyschides nitidus (Henderson, 1920)
 Cadulus pandionis (A. E. Verrill and S. Smith, 1880): synonym of Gadila pandionis (Verrill & Smith, 1880)
 Cadulus perpusillus (Sowerby, 1832): synonym of Gadila perpusilla (Sowerby in Broderip & Sowerby, 1832)
 Cadulus peruvianus Dall, 1908: synonym of Gadila peruviana (Dall, 1908)
 Cadulus poculum Dall, 1889: synonym of Gadila pocula (Dall, 1889)
 Cadulus rushii Pilsbry and Sharp, 1898: synonym of Polyschides rushii (Pilsbry & Sharp, 1898)
 Cadulus simpsoni Henderson, 1920: synonym of Gadila simpsoni Henderson, 1920
 Cadulus spectabilis A. E. Verrill, 1885: synonym of Polyschides spectabilis (A. E. Verrill, 1885)
 Cadulus strangulatus Locard, 1897: synonym of Gadila strangulata (Locard, 1897)
 Cadulus striatus Pilsbry and Sharp, 1898: synonym of Gadila striata (Pilsbry & Sharp, 1898)
 Cadulus subtilis Plate, 1908: synonym of Ditrupa gracillima Grube, 1878
 Cadulus verrilli Henderson, 1920: synonym of Gadila verrilli (Henderson, 1920)
 Cadulus viperidens Melvill & Standen, 1896: synonym of Dischides viperidens (Melvill & Standen, 1896)

References

 Powell A W B, New Zealand Mollusca, William Collins Publishers Ltd, Auckland, New Zealand 1979 
 
 Steiner G. & Kabat A.R. (2001). Catalogue of supraspecific taxa of Scaphopoda (Mollusca). Zoosystema 23 (3): 433-460

External links

Scaphopods